What a Woman Dreams of in Springtime (German: Was eine Frau im Frühling träumt) is a 1959 West German romantic comedy film directed by Erik Ode and Arthur Maria Rabenalt and starring Rudolf Prack, Winnie Markus and Ivan Desny.

The film's sets were designed by the art directors Emil Hasler and Walter Kutz. It was shot at the Spandau Studios and on location around Lake Constance.

Cast
 Rudolf Prack as Johannes Brandt
 Winnie Markus as Elisabeth Brandt
 Ivan Desny as Pierre Bonvant
 Chariklia Baxevanos as Helga
 Claus Biederstaedt as Fritz Bergstadt
 Christine Görner as Madeleine Sommer
 Melanie Horeschowsky as Großmutter Brandt
 Roland Kaiser as Rudi Brandt
 Hilde Volk as Fräulein Rabe
 Kurt Pratsch-Kaufmann as Fahrer Otto
 Horst Keitel as Orchesterchef
 Monika Peitsch as Freundin von Helga

References

Bibliography
 Bock, Hans-Michael & Bergfelder, Tim. The Concise CineGraph. Encyclopedia of German Cinema. Berghahn Books, 2009.

External links 
 

1959 films
1959 comedy films
German comedy films
West German films
1950s German-language films
Films directed by Erik Ode
Films directed by Arthur Maria Rabenalt
Films shot at Spandau Studios
1950s German films